The 1968 New York Mets season was the seventh regular season for the Mets. They went 73–89 and finished 9th in the National League. They were managed by Gil Hodges. They played home games at Shea Stadium.

Offseason 
 November 28, 1967: Clyde Mashore was drafted by the Mets from the Cincinnati Reds in the 1967 rule 5 draft.
 November 28, 1967: Darrell Sutherland was drafted from the Mets by the Cleveland Indians in the 1967 minor league draft.
 November 29, 1967: Bill Short was sold to the New York Mets by the Pittsburgh Pirates.
 December 15, 1967: Tommy Davis, Jack Fisher, Billy Wynne, and Buddy Booker were traded by the Mets to the Chicago White Sox for Tommie Agee and Al Weis.
 March 28, 1968: Clyde Mashore was returned by the Mets to the Cincinnati Reds.

Regular season 
1968 marked the beginning of Gil Hodges' tenure at the helm. A former infielder with the Brooklyn Dodgers, he replaced Salty Parker as manager. Despite the team's 9th place finish, the Mets managed to narrowly avoid yet another last place finish, and boasted their best record since their inception in 1962. They would go on to stun the baseball world the following year when they won the World Series.

Season standings

Record vs. opponents

Roster

Player stats

Batting

Starters by position 
Note: Pos = Position; G = Games played; AB = At bats; H = Hits; Avg. = Batting average; HR = Home runs; RBI = Runs batted in

Other batters 
Note: G = Games played; AB = At bats; H = Hits; Avg. = Batting average; HR = Home runs; RBI = Runs batted in

Pitching

Starting pitchers 
Note: G = Games pitched; IP = Innings pitched; W = Wins; L = Losses; ERA = Earned run average; SO = Strikeouts

Other pitchers 
Note: G = Games pitched; IP = Innings pitched; W = Wins; L = Losses; ERA = Earned run average; SO = Strikeouts

Relief pitchers 
Note: G = Games pitched; IP = Innings pitched; W = Wins; L = Losses; ERA = Earned run average; SO = Strikeouts

Farm system 

LEAGUE CHAMPIONS: Jacksonville, Marion

Notes

References 

1968 New York Mets at Baseball Reference
1968 New York Mets team page at www.baseball-almanac.com

New York Mets seasons
New York Mets season
New York Mets
1960s in Queens